Rikard is a given name. Notable people with the name include:

Rikard Andreasson (born 1979), Swedish cross country skier
Rikard Berge (1881–1969), Norwegian folklorist, museologist biographer and magazine editor
Rikard Bergh (born 1966), former professional tennis player from Sweden
Rikard Franzén (born 1968), retired professional ice hockey defenceman
Ivan Rikard Ivanović (1880–1949), one of the founders of the Croatian National Progressive Party (NNS)
Rikard Jorgovanić (1853–1880), Croatian writer
Rikard Karlberg (born 1986), Swedish professional golfer
Rikard Larsson (born 1966), Swedish politician
Rikard Lenac (1868–1949), lawyer and a one-time governor of the city of Fiume (Rijeka)
Rikard Lindroos (born 1985), Finnish footballer
Rikard Nilsson (born 1983), Swedish football defender
Rikard Nordraak (1842–1866), Norwegian composer who composed the Norwegian national anthem
Rikard Nordstrøm (1893–1955), Danish gymnast who competed in the 1912 Summer Olympics
Rikard Norling (born 1971), Swedish football manager
Rikard Nyström (1884–1943), Swedish missionary
Rikard Olsvik (1930–2017), Norwegian politician for the Labour Party
Rikard Wolff (1958–2017), Swedish stage and screen actor and singer